Jahfarr Wilnis (born February 26, 1986) is a Dutch Surinamese kickboxer, currently competing in the heavyweight division of Glory. He is the 2015 Kunlun Fight Super Heavyweight Tournament winner and the former Enfusion Heavyweight World Champion.

Combat Press ranked him in the heavyweight top ten between July 2015 and December 2017.

Professional kickboxing career

Early career
Winis faced Jairzinho Rozenstruik at K-1 World MAX 2010 West Europe Tournament on March 21, 2010. The fight was ruled a decision draw. He split wins and losses over his next three appearances, as he suffered a stoppage loss to Mitchell de Ligny at Kickbox gala Amstelveen on May 16, 2010, rebounded with a decision victory over Rowan Tol at Slamm Fighting with the Stars on August 29, 2010, but failed to build on this success as he lost by decision to Brian Douwes at Top Team Gala on October 16, 2011.

Wilnis faced Marco Vlieger at Battle Arena (K-1) on February 4, 2012. He won the fight by decision. Wilnis next faced Antonis Tzoros at The Battle 3 on June 9, 2012. He once again won by decision. Three weeks later, at Music Hall & BFN Group present: It's Showtime 57&58, Wilnis faced Sam Tevette. He won the fight by a third-round knockout.

Glory
Wilnis made his Glory debut against Jamal Ben Saddik at Glory 2: Brussels on October 6, 2012. He won the fight by unanimous decision. He would notch two more victories, stoppages of Oguz Ovguer at Glory 6: Istanbul on April 6, 2013 and Brice Guidon at Glory 10: Los Angeles on September 28, 2013, before his winning streak was snapped by Tomáš Hron at FFC08: Zelg vs. Rodriguez on October 25, 2013.

Wilnis faced Roman Kryklia at Kunlun Fight 21 on March 17, 2015, in the quarterfinals of the 2015 Kunlun Fight Super Heavyweight tournament. He won the fight by decision, after an extra fourth round was contested. The final two bouts of the tournament took place on the same day, at Kunlun Fight 26 on June 7, 2015. Wilnis overcame Asihati by a second-round knockout and advanced to the tournament finals, where he faced the former It's Showtime World Heavyweight champion Hesdy Gerges. He won the fight by an extra round decision.

Wilnis faced Valentin Slavikovski at Kunlun Fight 29 on August 18, 2015. He won the fight by unanimous decision. Following this victory, Wilnis returned to Glory to take part in the 2015 Glory Heavyweight Contender tournament and was booked to face Ben Edwards in the tournament semifinals, which took place at Glory 24: Denver on October 9, 2015. Although he was able to beat Edwards by a second-round technical knockout, he lost to Benjamin Adegbuyi by split decision in the finals of the one-day tournament.

Wilnis challenged the Enfusion Heavyweight World champion¸Ismael Lazaar at Enfusion Live 37 on February 27, 2016. He won the fight by unanimous decision.

Wilnis faced Kirill Kornilov in the semifinals of the 2016 Glory Heavyweight Contender tournament, which took place at Glory 29: Copenhagen on April 16, 2016. He won the fight by unanimous decision and faced Ismael Londt in the finals. He lost the fight by split decision.. Wilnis took part in another contender tournament at Glory 35: Nice on November 5, 2016, but suffered a first-round technical knockout at the hands of Mladen Brestovac in the tournament semifinals. 

Wilnis made his first Enfusion Heavyweight title defense against Luis Tavares at Enfusion 53 on September 30, 2017. Tavares won the fight by unanimous decision.

Wilnis faced Jamal Ben Saddik at Glory 53: Lille on May 12, 2018. He won the fight by unanimous decision.

Wilnis faced Tomáš Možný in the quarterfinals of the 2018 Glory Heavyweight tournament, which took place at Glory 62: Rotterdam on December 8, 2018. He won the fight by unanimous decision and advanced to the semifinals of the one-day tournament, where he faced Benjamin Adegbuyi. He lost the fight by a third-round knockout.

Wilnis faced D'Angelo Marshall at Glory 67: Orlando on July 5, 2019. He lost the fight by unanimous decision. Wilnis next faced Antonio Plazibat at Glory Collision 2. He lost the fight by split decision.

Wilnis faced Georgil Fibic at Yangames Fight Night 8 on August 27, 2020. He won the fight by a third-round knockout. Wilnis first staggered his opponent with a jumping switch knee, before he floored him with a right hook.

Wilnis faced Michał Bławdziewicz at Glory 82 on November 19, 2022, following a two-year break from the sport. He won the fight by unanimous decision.

Wilnis faced Tariq Osaro in the semifinals of a four-man Glory heavyweight tournament at Glory 85 on April 29, 2023.

Championships and accomplishments
Kunlun Fight
2015 Kunlun Fight Super Heavyweight Tournament Winner
Enfusion
2016 Enfusion Heavyweight World Championship
Glory
2015 Glory Heavyweight Contender Tournament Runner-up
2016 Glory Heavyweight Contender Tournament Runner-up

Kickboxing record

|- style="background:#cfc;"
| 2022-11-19 || Win ||align=left| Michał Bławdziewicz  || Glory 82 || Bonn, Germany || Decision (Unanimous) || 3 || 3:00
|-
|- style="background:#cfc;"
| 2020-08-27 || Win||align=left| Georgil Fibic  || Yangames Fight Night 8 || Prague, Czech Republic || KO (Jumping switch knee & Right hook)|| 3 ||  
|-
|-  bgcolor="#Fbb"
| 2019-12-21|| Loss||align=left| Antonio Plazibat || Glory Collision 2 || Arnhem, Netherlands || Decision (Split) || 3 || 3:00
|-  style="background:#Fbb;"
| 2019-07-05 || Loss||align=left| D'Angelo Marshall || Glory 67: Orlando || Orlando, USA || Decision (Unanimous) || 3 || 3:00 
|-
|- style="background:#fbb;"
| 2018-12-08 || Loss||align=left| Benjamin Adegbuyi || Glory 62: Rotterdam, Semi Finals || Rotterdam, Netherlands || KO (Head kick) || 3 ||  2:39 
|-
|- style="background:#cfc;"
| 2018-12-08 || Win||align=left| Tomáš Možný  || Glory 62: Rotterdam, Quarter Finals || Rotterdam, Netherlands || Decision (Unanimous) || 3 ||  3:00 
|-
|- style="background:#fbb;"
| 2018-09-14 || Loss ||align=left| Benjamin Adegbuyi || Glory 58: Chicago || Chicago, USA || Decision (Unanimous) || 3 || 3:00
|-
|-  style="background:#cfc;"
| 2018-05-12 || Win||align=left| Jamal Ben Saddik || Glory 53: Lille || Lille, France || Decision (Unanimous) || 3 ||  3:00
|-
|-  style="background:#fbb;"
| 2017-09-30 || Loss ||align=left| Luis Tavares || Enfusion Live 53 || Antwerp, Belgium || Decision (Unanimous)  || 5 || 3:00  
|-
! style=background:white colspan=9 |
|-
|-  style="background:#fbb;"
| 2016-11-05 || Loss ||align=left| Mladen Brestovac || Glory 35: Nice, Semi Finals || Nice, France || TKO (Left high kick) || 1 || 2:06
|-
|-  style="background:#fbb;"
| 2016-04-16 || Loss ||align=left| Ismael Londt || Glory 29: Copenhagen, Final || Copenhagen, Denmark || Decision (Split) || 3 || 3:00
|-
! style=background:white colspan=9 |
|-
|-  style="background:#cfc;"
| 2016-04-16 || Win ||align=left| Kirill Kornilov || Glory 29: Copenhagen, Semi Finals || Copenhagen, Denmark || Decision (Unanimous) || 3 || 3:00
|- 
|-  style="background:#cfc;"
| 2016-02-27 || Win ||align=left| Ismael Lazaar || Enfusion Live 37 || Eindhoven, Netherlands || Decision (Unanimous) || 5 || 3:00
|-
! style=background:white colspan=9 |
|-
|-  style="background:#fbb;"
| 2016-01-09 || Loss ||align=left| Roman Kryklia || Kunlun Fight 36 || Shanghai, China || Decision || 3 || 3:00 
|-  style="background:#fbb;"
| 2015-10-09 || Loss ||align=left| Benjamin Adegbuyi || Glory 24: Denver, Final || Denver, Colorado, USA || Decision (Split) || 3 || 3:00 
|-
! style=background:white colspan=9 |
|-  style="background:#cfc;"
| 2015-10-09 || Win ||align=left| Ben Edwards || Glory 24: Denver, Semi Finals || Denver, Colorado, USA || TKO (Low kicks) || 2 || 1:36
|-  style="background:#cfc;"
| 2015-08-15 || Win ||align=left| Valentin Slavikovski || Kunlun Fight 29 || Sochi, Russia || Decision (Unanimous) || 3 || 3:00
|-  style="background:#cfc;"
| 2015-06-07 || Win ||align=left| Hesdy Gerges || Kunlun Fight 26, Final || Chongqing, China || Ext. R. Decision (Unanimous) || 4 || 3:00
|-
! style=background:white colspan=9 |
|-  style="background:#cfc;"
| 2015-06-07 || Win ||align=left| Asihati || Kunlun Fight 26, Semi Finals || Chongqing, China || KO (Right straight) || 2 || 2:40
|-  style="background:#cfc;"
| 2015-03-17 || Win ||align=left| Roman Kryklia || Kunlun Fight 21, Quarter Finals || Sanya, China || Ext. R. Decision || 4 || 3:00
|-  style="background:#cfc;"
| 2015-01-03 || Win ||align=left| Alireza Karbasi || Kunlun Fight 15: The World MAX Return, Final 16 || Nanjing, China || TKO (Retirement) || 2 || 0:35 
|-  style="background:#fbb;"
| 2014-03-08 || Loss ||align=left| Mladen Brestovac || Glory 14: Zagreb ||Zagreb, Croatia || KO (Left high kick) || 1 || 1:19
|-  style="background:#fbb;"
| 2013-10-25 || Loss ||align=left| Tomáš Hron || FFC08: Zelg vs. Rodriguez || Zagreb, Croatia || Decision (Unanimous) || 3 ||3:00
|-  style="background:#cfc;"
| 2013-09-28 || Win ||align=left| Brice Guidon || Glory 10: Los Angeles || Ontario, California, USA || KO (Right hook) || 2 || 0:38
|-  style="background:#cfc;"
| 2013-04-06 || Win ||align=left| Oguz Ovguer || Glory 6: Istanbul || Istanbul, Turkey || KO (Punches) || 1 || 
|-  style="background:#cfc;"
| 2012-10-06 || Win ||align=left| Jamal Ben Saddik || Glory 2: Brussels || Brussels, Belgium || Decision (Unanimous) || 3 || 3:00
|-  style="background:#cfc;"
| 2012-06-30 || Win ||align=left| Sam Tevette || Music Hall & BFN Group present: It's Showtime 57&58 || Brussels, Belgium || KO || 3 || 
|-  style="background:#cfc;"
| 2012-06-09 || Win ||align=left| Antonis Tzoros  || The Battle 3 || Greece || Decision  || 5|| 2:00
|-  style="background:#cfc;"
| 2012-02-04 || Win ||align=left| Marco Vlieger || Battle Arena (K-1) || Zwevegem, Belgium || Decision || 3 || 3:00
|-  style="background:#fbb;"
| 2011-10-16 || Loss ||align=left| Brian Douwes || Top Team Gala || Beverwijk, Netherlands || Decision  || 3|| 
|-  style="background:#cfc;"
| 2010-08-29 || Win ||align=left| Rowan Tol  || Slamm Fighting with the Stars || Paramaribo, Suriname || KO  || 1|| 2
|-  style="background:#fbb;"
| 2010-05-16 || Loss ||align=left| Mitchell de Ligny  || Kickbox gala Amstelveen || Amstelveen, Netherlands || TKO (Punches and knee) ||  || 
|-  style="background:#c5d2ea;"
| 2010-03-21 || Draw ||align=left| Jairzinho Rozenstruik || K-1 World MAX 2010 West Europe Tournament || Utrecht, Netherlands || Decision || 3 || 3:00
|-
|-
| colspan=9 | Legend:

See also
 List of male kickboxers

References

External links
Profile at Glory

1986 births
Living people
Sportspeople from Utrecht (city)
Dutch male kickboxers
Heavyweight kickboxers
Dutch Muay Thai practitioners
Dutch sportspeople of Surinamese descent
Kunlun Fight kickboxers
Kunlun Fight kickboxing champions